Khan al-Harir (The Silk Khan) is a large khan in the Old City of Damascus.

See also
Khan As'ad Pasha
Khan Jaqmaq
Khan Sulayman Pasha
Khan Tuman

References

Bibliography

Caravanserais in Damascus
Buildings and structures completed in 1573
Ottoman architecture in Damascus
Buildings and structures inside the walled city of Damascus
1570s in Ottoman Syria
16th-century establishments in Ottoman Syria
1573 establishments in the Ottoman Empire